This is a list of Norwegian television related events from 1995.

Events
13 May - Norway wins the 40th Eurovision Song Contest in Dublin, Ireland. The winning song is the mostly instrumental piece, "Nocturne", performed by Secret Garden.

Debuts

International
 Heartbreak High (TVN)

Television shows

1990s
Sesam Stasjon (1991-1999)

Ending this year

Births

Deaths

See also
1995 in Norway